The 2021 Summer Deaflympics, officially known as the 24th Summer Deaflympics, was the international multi-sport event held in Caxias do Sul, Brazil, as the main host city from 1 May to 15 May 2022. In addition to Caxias, there are events scheduled for the neighboring cities of Farroupilha and Flores da Cunha. On April 12, 2022, CISS has announced that due to the Russian invasion of Ukraine, Russian and Belarusian athletes were barred from competing in Caxias do Sul, and in the same press release it was also announced that the bowling tournament was scheduled to be held in Kuala Lumpur, Malaysia, during October 20–30, 2022.

This is the first time the Games are being held in a Latin American country, in a South American country, and not during the summer of the host city (as it is autumn in May in the south of Brazil). This is also the first time since the 2007 Winter Deaflympics, held in Salt Lake City, for the event to be held in the CISS Americas Region, and the third time for the Games to be held in the Southern Hemisphere as the 1989 games were held in Christchurch in New Zealand and 2005 games Melbourne in Australia.

Host city selection

Brazil was selected as the host country for the 2021 Games at a meeting of the International Committee of Sports for the Deaf on February 26, 2020. The chosen city was Caxias do Sul, Rio Grande do Sul take place from December 5 to 21, 2021 during the late spring at the host city, as a consequence of the postponement of the 2020 Summer Olympics to 2021 was announced in January 2021 as a result of the COVID-19 pandemic the 2021 Summer Deaflympics was transferred to next year May. This is also the first such instance in the history of the Deaflympics (the 2011 Winter Games had been canceled in late 2010).

Caxias do Sul,  - Only bidder

Sports 
Originally, the program for this edition would consist of 221 finals in 18 sports. However, due to problems with the available infrastructure and the low number of participants, the bowling events had to be removed from Caxias do Sul and was later relocated to Kuala Lumpur in Malaysia and will be held on 20–30 October 2022. Thus, the program will consist of 216 events in 18 sports. Medals disputed in Malaysia will later be added to the medal table and their results and the number of athletes will be added later to official statistics. New events  were added in athletics, karate, orienteering, shooting, and swimming, whereas the number of events in bowling, judo, and taekwondo has been reduced. This will also be the first time since the 2001 Summer Deaflympics that a women's handball tournament will be held.

Individual sports
  (45)
  (6)
 (10)
Mountain biking (2)
Road (8)
 (2)
 (16)
 (16)
 (10)
 (13)
 (42)
 (7)
 (11)
 (5)
 (16)
Freestyle (8)
Greco-Roman (8)

Team sports
 (2)
 (2)
 (2)
 (4)
Indoor volleyball (2)
Beach volleyball (2)

Bowling
Bowling was held between on 21–30 October 2022 in Kuala Lumpur.

  (6)

Calendar
In the following calendar for the events held in Caxias do Sul, each blue box represents an event competition. The yellow boxes represent days during which medal-awarding finals for a sport are held. The number in each yellow box represents the number of finals that are contested on that day. This schedule doesn´t include the bowling events.

Participating nations

Belarusian and Russian will not compete at the event after a ban as a result of the Russian invasion of Ukraine. Great Britain and China also withdrew from the competition because of the worsening conditions related to the COVID-19 pandemic at the country.

72 National Deaf Sports Federations sent their delegations to Caxias do Sul and Kuala Lumpur:

  Afghanistan  (1)
  (12)
  (70)
  (5)
  (6)
  (4)
  (199) (Host)
  (22)
  (18)
  (16)
  (8)
  Chinese Taipei  (50)
  (23)
  (28)
  (18)
  (23)
  (34)
  (3)
  (11)
  (21)
  (7)
  (56)
  (3)
  (75)
  (75)
  (36)
  (12)
  (20)
  (64)
  (68)
  (25)
  (18)
  (78)
  (93)
  (58)
  (110)
  (90)
  (15)
  (17)
  (11)
  (42)
 
  (20)
  (5)
  (44)
  (5)
  (21)
  (8)
  (1)
  (6)
  (1)
  (1)
  (3)
  (144)
  (12)
  (23)
  (19)
  (14)
  (2)
  (12)
  (4)
  (7)
  (7)
  (5)
  (19)
  (130)
  (175)
  (7)
  (135)
  (3)
  (31)
  (39)

Medal table
Source:

Draw
On 30 March 2022:

Basketball

Women (9)
A:  /  /  / 

B:  /  /  /  /

Men (11)
A:  /  /  /  / 

B:  /  /  /  /  / Chinese Taipei

Football

Women (5)
A:  /  /  /  /

Men (20)
A:  /  /  /  / 

B:  /  /  /  / 

C:  /  /  /  / 

D:  /  /  /  /

Handball

Women (5)
A:  /  /  /  /

Men (8)
A:  /  /  / 

B:  /  /  /

Volleyball

Women (8)
A:  /  /  / 

B:  /  /  /

Men (10)
A:  /  /  /  / 

B:  /  /  /  /

Beach volleyball

Women (5)
A:  1 /  2 /  /  /

Men (17)
A:  /  /  /  1

B:  2 / /  /  1

C:  2 /  1 /  1 /  1 / 

D:  2 /  /  2 /  2

References

External links 

 Official website

 
Deaflympics
Summer Deaflympics
International sports competitions hosted by Brazil
Sport in Caxias do Sul
Parasports in Brazil
Summer Deaflympics
Multi-sport events in Brazil
Summer Deaflympics
Summer Deaflympics
2022 in disability sport